The 34th Royal Sikh Pioneers was an infantry regiment of the British Indian Army. They could trace their origins to 1857, when they were raised as the Punjab Sappers.

The regiment recruited the Mazhabi Sikhs and Ramdasia Sikhs of Punjab province.
Despite being Pioneers by name, the regiment was specially trained as Assault Pioneers.

Brief History
The regiment took part in the Siege of Delhi, the Siege of Lucknow and the Capture of Lucknow during the Indian Rebellion of 1857. They were next in action during the Second Afghan War in 1878 and the Relief of Chitral in 1897. To honour the visit of the Prince and Princess of Wales to Indian they took part in the Rawalpindi Parade 1905.

During World War I they were part of the 3rd (Lahore) Division and served on the Western Front, in the Mesopotamia Campaign and in the Sinai and Palestine Campaign.

After World War I the Indian government reformed the army moving from single battalion regiments to multi battalion regiments. In 1922, the 34th Sikh Pioneers now became the 2nd Battalion, 3rd Sikh Pioneers. The regiment was allocated to the new Indian Army on independence.

Notable Achievements

 They were the most highly decorated Sikh Regiment of the First World War.
 They became a "Royal" Regiment in 1921.

Predecessor names
Punjab Sappers - 1857
24th (Pioneer) Regiment of Punjab Infantry - 1858
32nd Bengal Native Infantry - 1861
32nd (Punjab) Bengal Native Infantry (Pioneers) - 1864
32nd (Punjab) Bengal Infantry (Pioneers) - 1885
32nd Punjab Pioneers - 1901
34th Sikh Pioneers - 1903

References

British Indian Army infantry regiments
Military units and formations established in 1857
Military units and formations disestablished in 1922
Bengal Presidency
1857 establishments in India